Natalie Augsburg (born 15 November 1983) is a German handball player. She plays on the German national team, and participated at the 2011 World Women's Handball Championship in Brazil.

References

1983 births
Living people
People from Krapkowice
Sportspeople from Opole Voivodeship
Polish emigrants to Germany
German female handball players